Jean Acker (born Harriet Ackers; October 23, 1892 – August 16, 1978) was an American actress with a career dating from the silent film era through the 1950s. She was perhaps best known as the estranged wife of silent film star Rudolph Valentino.

Early life and career
Jean Acker was born Harriet Ackers on October 23, 1892 in Trenton, New Jersey to Joseph and Margaret Ackers. The 1900 census indicates an 1891 birthdate, and other sources have suggested an 1893 birthdate. However, her burial plot says 1892. Her parents divorced, and her father remarried to Eleanor Bruseren in 1906. They had two sons together, both named Joseph. Their first son died at 4 months old in 1907, and their second son was a stillbirth. Eleanor and Joseph divorced in 1912, and he remarried a third time to Virginia Erb. Her father managed the Casino Bowling Alley and The Ritz Restaurant, and later owned the Boston Shoe Store on Valley Street. He also managed several bowling alleys in the Philadelphia area. In 1906, the family moved to Lewistown. Growing up on a farm, Ackers became an expert horsewoman. She attended St. Mary's Seminary in Springfield, New Jersey for a time. 

She performed in vaudeville until she moved to California in 1919. After arriving in Hollywood, Acker became the protegee and lover of Alla Nazimova, an actress whose clout and contacts enabled Acker to negotiate a $200 per week contract with a movie studio. Acker appeared in numerous films during the 1910s and 1920s, but by the early 1930s, she began appearing in small, mostly uncredited film roles. She made her last on-screen appearance in the 1955 film How to Be Very, Very Popular, opposite Betty Grable.

Marriage to Valentino

After meeting and befriending the then-struggling actor Rudolph Valentino at a party, they entered a two-month courtship and married on November 6, 1919. Acker quickly had regrets and locked him out of their hotel bedroom on their wedding night. The marriage was reportedly never consummated.

After filing for divorce, Valentino did not wait the requisite period for it to be finalized before marrying his second wife, Natacha Rambova, in Mexico, and he was charged with bigamy when the couple returned to the United States. Acker then sued Valentino for the legal right to call herself Mrs. Rudolph Valentino. Valentino remained angry with her for several years, but they mended their friendship before his death in 1926. Acker wrote a popular song about him soon after he died called "We Will Meet at the End of the Trail".

Acker had an affair with the actress Alla Nazimova. Nazimova included Acker in what was dubbed the sewing circles, a group of actresses who were forced to conceal the fact that they were lesbian or bisexual, thus living secret lives. Another of her female lovers was Grace Darmond, with whom she was involved during her relationship with Valentino.

In the 1977 film Valentino a character loosely based on Acker is played by Carol Kane. In the credits, the character is simply called Starlet.

Later life and death
After divorcing Valentino in 1923, Acker was engaged to Marquis Luis de Bezan y Sandoval of Spain. Then, she was in the news over her relationship with Rahmin Bey. In 1930, after she lost her fortune in the 1929 stock market crash, she sued William Delahanty, claiming that he agreed to pay her $18,400 per year if she gave up her film career. The married politician denied that he made such a promise but admitted that he spent thousands of dollars on Acker. Acker met Chloe Carter (June 21, 1903 – October 28, 1993), a former Ziegfeld Follies girl, who was the first wife of film composer Harry Ruby. Acker remained with Carter for the rest of her life. The couple owned an apartment building together in Beverly Hills. Acker died of natural causes in 1978 at the age of 85, and is buried next to Carter at the Holy Cross Cemetery in Culver City, California.

Legacy
Although not born in the Central Pennsylvania town of Lewistown, Jean Acker is considered a local celebrity. Her face dominates an outdoor mural titled "Mifflin County Movie History" and is located on Monument Square in Downtown Lewistown. The mural was painted in 2012 by Dwight Kirkland of Blackleaf Studio, Mifflintown, Pennsylvania.

Filmography

References

External links

1893 births
1978 deaths
Actresses from New Jersey
American film actresses
American silent film actresses
Catholics from New Jersey
Burials at Holy Cross Cemetery, Culver City
American LGBT actors
LGBT Christians
LGBT people from New Jersey
Actors from Trenton, New Jersey
Vaudeville performers
20th-century American actresses
Rudolph Valentino